Astrothelium trypethelioides is a species of corticolous (bark-dwelling) lichen in the family Trypetheliaceae. Found in Venezuela, it was formally described as a new species in 2016 by André Aptroot. Its ascospores are hyaline, spindle-shaped (fusiform) with between 7 and 9 septa and dimensions of 49–52 by 13–16 µm. No lichen products were detected in the species using thin-layer chromatography.

References

trypethelioides
Lichen species
Lichens described in 2016
Lichens of Venezuela
Taxa named by André Aptroot